This article lists important figures and events in the public affairs of British Malaya during the year 1935, together with births and deaths of prominent Malayans.

Incumbent political figures

Central level 
 Governor of Federated of Malay States :
 Shenton Whitelegge Thomas
 Chief Secretaries to the Government of the FMS :
 Malcolm Bond Shelley (until unknown date)
 Marcus Rex (from unknown date)
 Governor of Straits Settlements :
 Shenton Whitelegge Thomas

State level 
  Perlis :
 Raja of Perlis : Syed Alwi Syed Saffi Jamalullail
  Johore :
 Sultan of Johor : Sultan Ibrahim Al-Masyhur
  Kedah :
 Sultan of Kedah : Abdul Hamid Halim Shah
  Kelantan :
 Sultan of Kelantan : Sultan Ismail Sultan Muhammad IV
  Trengganu :
 Sultan of Trengganu : Sulaiman Badrul Alam Shah
  Selangor :
 British Residents of Selangor :
 George Ernest London (until unknown date)
 Theodore Samuel Adams (from unknown date)
 Sultan of Selangor : Sultan Sir Alaeddin Sulaiman Shah
  Penang :
 Monarchs : King George V 
 Residents-Councillors :  Arthur Mitchell Goodman
  Malacca :
 Monarchs : King George V 
 Residents-Councillors :
  Negri Sembilan :
 British Residents of Negri Sembilan : John Whitehouse Ward Hughes
 Yang di-Pertuan Besar of Negri Sembilan : Tuanku Abdul Rahman ibni Almarhum Tuanku Muhammad 
   Pahang :
 British Residents of Pahang :
 Hugh Goodwin Russell Leonard (until unknown date)
 C. C. Brown (from unknown date)
 Sultan of Pahang : Sultan Abu Bakar
  Perak :
 British Residents of Perak : G. E. Cater
 Sultan of Perak : Sultan Iskandar Shah

Events 
 14 January – Convent Datuk Keramat was founded by Rev. Mother Tarcisius.
 Unknown date – Catholic High School, Singapore was founded by the Rev. Father Edward Becheras.
 Unknown date – The Criminal Procedure Code (Malaysia) was enacted.

Births
 1 January – Mustapha Maarof – Malaysian actor (died 2014)
 22 January – Saloma – Singaporean-Malaysian singer, film actress, trendsetter and fashion icon (died 1983)
 24 March – Lee San Choon - Malaysian politician and businessman (died 2023)
 9 April – A. Samad Said – Malaysian National Laureate
 28 May – Azizan Zainul Abidin - businessman (died 2004)
 20 September – Wong Phui Nam - Malaysian economist and poet (died 2022)
 1 October – Peter Velappan - Malaysian football administrator and manager (died 2018)
 4 October – Law Hieng Ding - politician (died 2018)
 5 November – Jins Shamsuddin – film actor, director and politician (died 2017)

Deaths

See also
 1935
 1934 in Malaya
 1936 in Malaya
 History of Malaysia

References

1930s in British Malaya
Malaya